Chactuchac is the first album by Argentine rock band Los Piojos, released in 1992.
The album was recorded and mixed by Los Piojos and Adrián Rivarola between June and August in 1992 at the Del Cielito Records studio. The main idea for the first album was to use everything they have been recording between the years of 1986 and 1992 and what they have played live, their best known tracks.

The album was remastered in 2007 in Digipack format with a brand new art. Edited by El Farolito Records.

Track listing 
 "Llevatelo" [Take It Away] (Andrés Ciro Martínez) – 5:35
 "Chac Tu Chac" (Buira, Fernandez, Pablo Guerra, Martínez, Rodriguez) – 3:38
 "Tan Solo" [So Lonely] (Martínez) – 4:00
 "Cancheros" [Arrogants] (Buira, Martínez) – 4:52
 "Los Mocosos" [The Brats] (Guerra, Martínez) – 5:00
 "A Veces" [Sometimes] (Buira, Fernandez, Kupinski, Martínez, Pocho, Rodriguez) – 3:49
 "Blues del traje gris" [Grey Suit Blues] (Martínez, Tian Brass) – 2:55
 "Yira - Yira" (Enrique Santos Discépolo) – 3:01
 "Pega - pega" [Kick Kick] (Guerra, Martínez) – 3:40
 "Siempre bajando" [Always Going Down] (Diego Chavez, Martínez) – 4:47
 "Cruel" [Cruel] (Martínez) – 4:06

Personnel 

 Dani Buira – drums, backing vocals, percussion
 Andrés Ciro Martínez – backing vocals, guitar, harmonica, vocals
 Gustavo Kupinski – lead guitar
 Daniel Fernández – guitar
 Miguel Ángel Rodríguez - bass

External links 
 Chactuchac 

1993 albums
Los Piojos albums